Arne Klavenes (born 26 July 1952) is a Norwegian cyclist. He was born in Holmestrand. He competed at the 1976 Summer Olympics in Montreal, where he placed eighth in the team time trial with the Norwegian team, which consisted of Geir Digerud, Stein Bråthen, Magne Orre and Klavenes.

References

1952 births
Living people
People from Holmestrand
Norwegian male cyclists
Olympic cyclists of Norway
Cyclists at the 1976 Summer Olympics
Sportspeople from Vestfold og Telemark